The Bohemian and Moravian koruna, known as the Protectorate crown, was the currency of the Protectorate of Bohemia and Moravia between 1939 and 1945. It was subdivided into 100 haléřů.

History

The Bohemian and Moravian koruna replaced the Czechoslovak koruna at par and was replaced by the reconstituted Czechoslovak koruna, again at par. It was pegged to the Reichsmark at a rate of 1 Reichsmark = 10 koruna and was initially equal in value to the Slovak koruna, although this currency was devalued in 1940.

Coins

In 1940, zinc 10, 20 and 50 haléřů coins were introduced, followed by 1 koruna in 1941. The coins were minted until 1944. The reverse designs were very similar to the earlier Czechoslovak coins. The coins were emergency issue types, similar to the coins of other German-occupied territories.

Banknotes

Czechoslovak banknotes for 1 koruna and 5 korun were stamped (and later printed) with "Protektorat Böhmen und Mähren" over "Protektorát Čechy a Morava," and subsequently issued in Bohemia and Moravia beginning on February 9, 1940. These were followed by regular government issues of 1, 5, 50 and 100 korun in 1940, 10 korun in 1942, and 20 and 50 korun in 1944. Nationalbank für Böhmen und Mähren in Prag (National Bank for Bohemia and Moravia in Prague) introduced 500 and 100 korun notes in 1942, followed in 1943 by overprinted Czechoslovak 5000 korun notes. In 1944, the National Bank issued regular 5000 korun notes.

See also

 Czechoslovak koruna
 Czech koruna
 Slovak koruna

References

Sources

External links
Protectorate banknotes (catalog, gallery and other details)
 
 

Protectorate of Bohemia and Moravia
Currencies of Europe
Currencies of Czechoslovakia
Currencies introduced in 1939
Modern obsolete currencies
1945 disestablishments in Czechoslovakia
Coins of Europe
Zinc and aluminum coins minted in Germany and occupied territories during World War II
Lists of coins